Matthew Dufty (born 10 January 1996) is an Australian professional rugby league footballer who plays as a  for the Warrington Wolves in the Betfred  Super League.

He previously played for the St. George Illawarra Dragons and the Canterbury-Bankstown Bulldogs in the NRL.

Background
Dufty was born on 10 January 1996 in Hurstville, New South Wales, Australia. He attended Marist Catholic College Penshurst from Year 7 to Year 10.

He played his junior rugby league for the Penshurst RSL RLFC, before being signed by the St. George Illawarra Dragons.

Playing career

Early career
From 2014 to 2016, Dufty played for the St. George Illawarra Dragons' NYC team.

In July 2016, he played for the New South Wales under-20s team against the Queensland under-20s team, 

In 2016 he re-signed with the St. George club on a two-year contract until the end of 2018. In September 2016, he was named on the interchange bench in the 2016 NYC Team of the Year.
Dufty played 65 games and scored 55 tries for 220 points in his U20s career from 2014 to 2016.

2017
In 2017, Dufty graduated to St. George Illawarra's Intrust Super Premiership NSW team, the Illawarra Cutters. In round 20 of the 2017 NRL season, he made his NRL debut for the St. George club against the Manly Warringah Sea Eagles, scoring a try and providing two try assists.

2018
In the 2018 NRL season, Dufty made 26 appearances for St. George and scored 13 tries as the club finished 7th on the table and qualified for the finals.  Dufty played in both finals games, the 48-18 upset victory against Brisbane at Suncorp Stadium and the 13-12 elimination final defeat against South Sydney.

2019
On 18 February Dufty signed a two-year contract extension to remain at St. George Illawarra until the end of the 2021 season.
On 25 April Dufty scored an individual 65 metre try for St. George Illawarra during their match against the Sydney Roosters in the traditional ANZAC Day game.  Fox Sports Commentator Andrew Voss said of the try "What a try here at the SCG!, So many great tries over many, many years, and the name Matt Dufty belongs to one as of today.  That is super. Tedesco is looking up saying, 'Which way did he go? ... How many steps Dufty? More than the Opera House!".

Dufty made a total of 16 appearances and scored five tries for St. George Illawarra in the 2019 NRL season as the club endured one of the worst ever seasons finishing 15th on the table just above the last placed Gold Coast.

2020
On 15 February, Dufty suffered a fractured cheekbone whilst playing for St. George Illawarra in the pre-season NRL Nines competition against Parramatta and was ruled out for six to eight weeks.

Dufty returned to the St. George Illawarra side for their round 2 match against Penrith at Kogarah Oval.  Dufty scored two tries in a 28-32 loss.

In round 10 against Canterbury, Dufty scored two tries as St. George Illawarra won the match 28-22 at WIN Stadium.  This was Dufty's fifth try in three matches.

In round 20, Dufty scored two tries in a 30-22 victory over Melbourne at Kogarah Oval.  Dufty finished the season with 13 tries for the club.

2021
In round 3 of the 2021 NRL season, Dufty scored two tries in a 38-12 victory over Manly at WIN Stadium.

In round 5 of the 2021 NRL season, Dufty scored two tries and created two try assists to defeat Parramatta.

In round 9 of the 2021 NRL season, he scored two tries in a 32-12 victory over Canterbury.

In round 13, Dufty scored two tries and had five try assists in a man of the match performance as St. George Illawarra defeated Brisbane 52-24.

In June, Dufty was informed by the club that his services would not be required for next season as he was not part of their plans going into the future. It was then reported that several northern hemisphere clubs, including St Helens, had expressed an interest in signing Dufty. It was revealed in July that Dufty had signed with the Canterbury-Bankstown Bulldogs on a one-year deal for the 2022 season.

2022
In round 1 of the 2022 NRL season, Dufty made his club debut for Canterbury in their 6-4 victory against North Queensland at the Queensland Country Bank Stadium.

On 21 July 2022, the Canterbury-Bankstown Bulldogs officially announced an early release grant for Dufty to take up an opportunity in the Super League.  On the same day, Dufty signed a two-and-a-half-year deal to join English side Warrington.
In round 21 of the 2022 Super League season, Dufty made his Warrington debut against Huddersfield which ended in defeat.  Dufty injured his foot during the match and was taken from the field in the second half.
In round 26 of the 2022 Super League season, Dufty scored four tries for Warrington in a 38-36 loss against Huddersfield.

Controversy
On 5 July 2021, Dufty was fined $23,000 by the NRL and suspended for one game after breaching the game's Covid-19 bio-security protocols when he attended a party along with 12 other St. George Illawarra players at Paul Vaughan's property.

References

External links

St. George Illawarra Dragons profile
Dragons profile

1996 births
Living people
Australian rugby league players
Australian expatriate sportspeople in England
Canterbury-Bankstown Bulldogs players
Illawarra Cutters players
Rugby league fullbacks
Rugby league players from Sydney
St. George Illawarra Dragons players
Warrington Wolves players